Ro05-4082 (N-methylclonazepam, ID-690) is a benzodiazepine derivative developed in the 1970s. It has sedative and hypnotic properties, and has around the same potency as clonazepam itself. It was never introduced into clinical use. It is a structural isomer of meclonazepam (3-methylclonazepam), and similarly has been sold as a designer drug, first being identified in Sweden in 2017.

See also
 Clonazolam
 Cloniprazepam
 Flunitrazepam

References 

Abandoned drugs
Pharmacology
Nervous system
Designer drugs